European Radio for Belarus (Eŭrapéjskaje Rádyjo dla Biełarúsi, ERB, Euroradio.fm) is an international radio station that provides independent news, information, and entertainment to the citizens of Belarus launched on February 26, 2006. ERB operates on FM, OIRT FM, Internet, and Satellite to reach the widest audience. Its staff includes around 20 people in the Warsaw office and ten journalists in the Minsk office.

The mission of the radio is to deliver factual, current, independent, trustworthy and up-to-date information to Belarusian listeners about events in Belarus and rest of the world, as well as to promote European democratic values. The project also aims to assist the development of a new generation of journalists, who will be able to work professionally in Belarus in the future during a transition to democracy and free market. The station has one of the highest ratings among propaganda-free media in Belarus.

History

Launch 

Euroradio was established by the Belarusian journalist Dmitry Novikov, former head of the popular Minsk Radio 101.2, which was shut down by the authorities in 1996. Novikov was also one of the Radio Racja founders. He established European Radio for Belarus as a non-profit organization in September 2005 in Warsaw, Poland. Other participants in the launch were Belarusian journalists as well as BAJ, NGOs from Poland, Lithuania, and Czech Republic. The core of the staff was formed by experienced journalists - Slava Koran, Sergey Akhramovich, Hanna Borowska.

ERB first broadcast was on February 26, 2006. The station targeted the youth audience and aimed for a 70/30 balance of music and news. The headquarters were located at Puławska Street in Warsaw’s Mokotów district.

Editors Office 

In the Summer of 2009 Belarus Ministry of Foreign Affairs finally allowed ERB to open its correspondent office in Minsk. Since then the Minsk office has been responsible for content creation, while the one in Warsaw supported broadcasting.

In November 2009 ERB received a yearly accreditation for broadcasting. Chairman of the Euroradio board Dmitry Novikov commented that the step was taken by the government only after the EU pressure. The accreditation has to be prolonged yearly. By 2014 ERB audience was around 300,000, mostly 18-30 years old.

Euradio was headed by Julia Slutzkaya until 2010 when she had to leave the country after presidential elections. Vitaliy Zubluk became the new chief editor, he resigned in 2016 and became the general producer. He was succeeded by famous blogger Victor Malishesvky. Dr. Anastasiya Ilyina was an editor of ERB in 2010–2019. On April 2, 2018, Victor Malishevsky took the post of creative editor, Pavel Sverdlov became ERB chief editor.

In 2019 the station underwent restructuring, five journalists from the Warsaw office and several in Minsk were made redundant. Chief editor Sverdlov commented on this as on business optimization. The anonymous source explained that ERB funding had recently decreased significantly.

Content

Music 

A significant part of the broadcasting is taken up by world and Belarusian (about 10%) music. ERB initiates various projects to support Belarusian musicians including annual Be Free festival in Ukraine, the «» awards, publishing of the Budzma The Best Rock / Budzma The Best Rock/New compilation.

Programs 

Each hour starts with a news bulletin of approximately 3 minutes in length followed by the short news update in the middle of the hour. In addition, broadcasting consists of economic, cultural, and sports programs as well as experts’ commentary on the wide variety of issues. Guests and Interviewees on ERB's daily programs include prominent politicians and other recognized public figures as well as representatives of independent Belarusian youth communities and organizations. ERB provides special news updates on breaking news as necessary.

News bulletins are broadcast daily from 7 am to 10 pm three times per hour. ERB has three flagship programs – EuroZOOM, Petard, and Cardiogram. EuroZoom is a daily informational program that covers Belarus in the political and cultural space of Europe. Petard presents the five most actual topics of the current events. Cardiogram is dedicated to the human rights agenda. The programs are also broadcast by several Lithuanian and Ukrainian stations. In September 2009 the Belarusian Ministry of Information sent an official warning to Autoradio for broadcasting EuroZoom.

Investigations 
ERB gradually developed its own section of investigative journalism. The reporters worked on important, controversial topics, many of which are not allowed to be covered on state media. For example, in 2013 Yauhen Valoshyn published his investigation on the poppy seeds market in Belarus.

On September 9, 2014, ERB journalist Dmitry Lukashuk interviewed DNR Prime Minister Alexander Zakharchenko. Two days later Lukashuk facilitated release from captivity of 8 Ukrainian soldiers, directly asking Zakharchenko to free these men.

State Pressure 
All TV and radio channels in Belarus are governmental and controlled by the BelTA agency. The Belarusian journalists and chief editors open up about KGB following their steps and wiretap their calls. According to them, every independent media in the country has its own ‘curator’ in KGB, the officers have a schedule - one official interrogation per year and two unofficial ones.

In 2008 the editors office was searched by the police, almost all equipment was confiscated. The staff relocated to Warsaw.

After the presidential elections 2010, Zybluk was detained and interrogated by KGB. On December 25, 2010, the police searched ERB Minsk news office and confiscated almost all equipment from it. The search was performed on Saturday, when no staff members were present at the office, and without warning.

In 2012 Pavel Sverdlov was detained by the police on his way home from the office, he was sentenced for 15 days in prison for ‘swearing in a public place’. Sverdlov wasn’t allowed to meet a lawyer, his case was based on contradicting testimonies of two policemen. In six months he was refused the journalist’s press accreditation because of this conviction.

During the presidential elections in 2015 Belarusian independent press faced constraints in access to information. ERB website blocked on October 12, 2015.

During the protest rallies after presidential election 2020 in Belarus independent media were blocked inside the country, the Internet was cut out since August 9. Euroradio.by website was under DDoS attack. ERB journalists were many times detained by the police while covering news on protest rallies after the elections.

Awards 
ERB journalist Maryna "Rusya" Shukyurava received ‘П’еро’ Award inFreedom of Speech nomination (2009);
Dmitry Lukashuk got first prize at BAJ ‘Вольнае слова’ Competition (2015).

References

Radio stations in Belarus
International broadcasters
Radio stations established in 2005
Censorship in Belarus